Bombril is a Brazilian manufacturer of household cleaning agents.  Their main product is a fine-grade steel wool marketed with the brand "Bom Bril".  The company at one point had 90% share of the Brazilian market for that product.

The company was created on 1948-01-14 at the Brooklin Paulista borough of São Paulo, by entrepreneur Roberto Sampaio Ferreira, with the name Abrasivos Bombril Ltda. The name was a contraction and shortening of the Portuguese words bom brilho, meaning "good shine".

Besides the Bom Bril steel wool, the company markets several other products such as the "Limpol" brand of dishwashing detergent, the "Pinho Bril" scented disinfectant detergents, and the "Radium" scouring powder.

References

External links
 Official site

Manufacturing companies established in 1948
Companies listed on B3 (stock exchange)
Manufacturing companies based in São Paulo
Brazilian brands
Brazilian companies established in 1948